Valentin Kovalenko (born 9 August 1975) is an Uzbekistani football referee of Ukrainian and Russian origin. He referees at the Uzbekistan Super League and Uzbekistan Cup.

He refereed at the 2011 AFC Asian Cup, 2012 AFC Cup Final and 2014 World Cup qualifiers, beginning with the preliminary-round match between Iraq and Yemen. During 2006 World Cup qualifying, he also served as an assistant referee.

AFC Asian Cup

References

1975 births
Uzbekistani football referees
Living people
Sportspeople from Tashkent
Uzbekistani people of Ukrainian descent
Uzbekistani people of Russian descent
AFC Asian Cup referees